The Art Rooney Pace is an American harness racing event for three-year-old standardbred pacers run each year at Yonkers Raceway with the exception of 2006 when it was hosted by Monticello Raceway.   First run in 1989, it is named in honor of Art Rooney (1901-1988), owner of several racetracks, including Yonkers, plus the Pittsburgh Steelers of the National Football League.

Records
 Most wins by a driver
 4 – John Campbell (1990, 1993, 1994, 1999)

 Most wins by a trainer
 4 – William Robinson (1991, 1992, 1994, 1997)

 Stakes record
 1:51 0/0 – Pet Rock (2012)

Art Rooney Pace winners

References

Yonkers Raceway
Yonkers, New York
Harness races in the United States
Harness races for three-year-old pacers
Sports in New York (state)
Recurring sporting events established in 1989
1989 establishments in New York (state)